Wells is a small city in Elko County, in northeast Nevada in the western United States. The population was 1,292 at the 2010 census.

History
The site of Wells began as a place called Humboldt Wells along the trail to California. It was subsequently founded as a railroad town along the original Transcontinental Railroad, and was once a stopover for passenger trains. The Humboldt River has its source in springs and a swampy area just west of the city that today is called Humboldt Wells. In the late 19th century, Humboldt Wells was burning down, and in a frantic plea for help, a telegraph was sent that said, "Wells is burning". After this the town was rebuilt and simply referred to as 'Wells'.

A magnitude 6.0 earthquake occurred near Wells at 6:16 A.M. on February 21, 2008. Because of its proximity to the epicenter, Wells experienced significant damage. The earthquake originated 9 km below the surface, with its epicenter only  distant from Wells, at 41.077, 114.752.

Geography

Wells is located by the intersection of Interstate 80 and U.S. Route 93.

Demographics

As of the census of 2000, there were 1,346 people, 525 households, and 352 families residing in the city. The population density was 195.6 people per square mile (75.5/km). There were 633 housing units at an average density of 92.0 per square mile (35.5/km). The racial makeup of the city was 80.24% White, 6.76% Native American, 0.30% Asian, 0.15% Pacific Islander, 9.06% from other races, and 3.49% from two or more races. Hispanic or Latino of any race were 19.47% of the population.

There were 525 households, out of which 35.4% had children under the age of 18 living with them, 52.6% were married couples living together, 9.7% had a female householder with no husband present, and 32.8% were non-families. 28.8% of all households were made up of individuals, and 9.5% had someone living alone who was 65 years of age or older. The average household size was 2.56 and the average family size was 3.14.

In the city, the population was spread out, with 29.3% under the age of 18, 7.6% from 18 to 24, 27.9% from 25 to 44, 25.0% from 45 to 64, and 10.3% who were 65 years of age or older. The median age was 36 years. For every 100 females, there were 107.7 males. For every 100 females age 18 and over, there were 106.5 males.

The median income for a household in the city was $35,870, and the median income for a family was $41,827. Males had a median income of $31,250 versus $20,852 for females. The per capita income for the city was $16,835. About 8.6% of families and 11.9% of the population were below the poverty line, including 18.9% of those under age 18 and 2.1% of those age 65 or over.

Education
Public education in Wells is administered by Elko County School District. The district operates one elementary school and Wells High School.

Wells has a public library, a branch of the Elko-Lander-Eureka County Library System.

Notable people
Mae Caine, suffragist and women’s rights activist, civic leader, and government official

References

External links

 Wells Chamber of Commerce
 Elko County
 Wells Branch Library
 Early history and photos
 Wells High School

Cities in Elko County, Nevada
Cities in Nevada
Elko, Nevada micropolitan area